Carambar is a brand of chewy caramel candy from France, owned by Eurazeo.

History
In 1954, Mr. Fauchille, director of the Delespaul-Hazard company, and Mr. Gallois, an employee, had a surplus of cocoa and decided to create a new, original recipe to use it up. The legend says that one of the machines in the factory was malfunctioning, making the long bars that still exists today. This sweet, in the form of a bar was named Caram'bar.

Each of the original Caram'bars were a regulated size and weight. The statistics are as follows:
 Length: 7 cm
 Weight: 10 g
 Recommended retail price: 5 centimes
 Wrapper: Yellow, with red striped twisted ends

Inside of the wrappers, there were "Carambar points" which could be redeemed for various Carambar-related products until 1961, when points were replaced by jokes. Carambar is famous for the poor quality of these jokes, and the expression blague Carambar refers to a bad or childish joke.

In 1972, the name changed to "Super Caram'bar". In 1977, the name lost its apostrophe.

Flavours
Currently, there are many different flavours all available in multipacks:
 Natural Flavours (Arômes Naturels)
 Lemon / Citron
 Strawberry / Fraise
 Orange
 Raspberry / Framboise
 Peach/pêche
 Drinks
 Cola / Coca
 Grenadine
 Oasis Peach Tea/Thé à la pêche
 Orangina yellow / jaune
 Other flavours
 Cherry / Cerise
 Candy floss / Cotton Candy / Barbe à papa
 Caramel
 Caranougat
 Orangina red / rouge
 Lime / Citron vert
 Bigoouu / Pomme Cassis / Double Flavor
 Passion fruit / Fruit de la passion

There are now various other flavours available which include the Carambar Atomic, which has sherbet inside. These have strange names like Green Cactus. There are Titeuf ones which have pictures of the Swiss comic strip star Titeuf and his friends. The Titeuf Carambars are blue on the outside and yellow inside or vice versa.

External links
 Carambar.fr — Official Carambar website 
 Le dossier de marque (PDF) — Listing of the history and development of the Carambar 
 Carambar : De l'or en barre - Historia's article 

French brands
French confectionery
Candy bars